Go First Airlines, founded as GoAir Airlines, is an Indian ultra-low-cost  airline based in Mumbai, Maharashtra. It is owned by the Indian business conglomerate Wadia Group. In October 2017, it was the fifth largest airline in India with an 8.4% passenger market share. It commenced operations on 4 November 2005 and operates a fleet of Airbus A320 aircraft in an all economy configuration.

In March 2020, the airline operated over 330 daily flights to 36 destinations, including 27 domestic and nine international destinations, from its bases at Mumbai, Delhi, Bangalore, Kolkata, Hyderabad and Chandigarh, and Kannur. The airline is planning to launch an IPO to raise Rs 36 billion from the primary market and has filed a DRHP for the same with Indian stock market regulator SEBI.

History
Go First was founded as GoAir on 4 November 2005 by Jeh Wadia, son of Indian industrialist Nusli Wadia. The airline is a wholly owned subsidiary of the Wadia Group. GoAir commenced its operations using an Airbus A320 aircraft and operated its inaugural flight from Mumbai to Ahmedabad on 4 November 2005. The airline initially operated with a single aircraft to four destinations including Goa and Coimbatore with plans to induct 36 aircraft by 2008. In March 2008, the airline announced revised plans to operate 11 aircraft and service new destinations in North East and South India by the end of the year. Increasing fuel prices forced Go First to cut down the existing number of flights in June 2008.

In January 2009, British Airways was interested in buying a stake in the airline. In November 2009, GoAir entered into talks with Indian airline SpiceJet over a possible merger which ended in a no deal. In April 2012, GoAir became the fifth largest airline in India in terms of market share following the demise of Kingfisher Airlines. In 2013, the airline appointed investment bank JP Morgan to scout for potential investors. The airline's growth has been slow compared to other airlines established at the same time such as IndiGo and SpiceJet, which have larger market share, fleet size and destinations served as of 2016.

According to the airline, it is a planned strategy due to the tough aviation environment in India and to focus on maintaining profitability rather than on capturing market share and increasing the destinations and fleet size. As of February 2016, it was the fifth largest carrier in the country with an 8% market share. The airline is planning for an initial public offering (IPO) in 2020. The airline took delivery of its 20th aircraft in June 2016, making it eligible to operate international flights.

GoAir became the sixth Indian domestic carrier to fly international when it launched its inaugural flight to Phuket from New Delhi on 11 October 2018.

On 17 March 2020, due to the impact of the COVID-19 pandemic, GoAir suspended its international flights. On 13 May 2021, GoAir was rebranded as Go First.

Corporate affairs

The airline is headquartered in the Wadia International Centre in Worli, Mumbai, India. Jehangir Wadia served as the managing director of the airline since its inception until his resignation in 2021. Kaushik Khona is the CEO of Go First.

Destinations

In March 2020, Go First operated to a network of 39 destinations – 29 domestic and 10 international to Thailand (Bangkok and Phuket), Muscat, Abu Dhabi and Dubai, Kuwait City, Singapore , Colombo and Malé. As of now, Go First operates international flights from Mumbai, Delhi, Bengaluru, Kannur and Kolkata. The airline has a total of 325 daily flights and more than 2200 weekly flights. The airline maintains bases at Delhi, Kolkata, Bengaluru, Kannur and Mumbai airports.

The airline commenced its first international operations on 11 October 2018 from Delhi to Phuket, then from Mumbai to Phuket on 12 October, from Mumbai and Delhi to Malé on 14 and 17 October respectively.

Fleet

, Go First operates an all  Airbus A320 fleet:

New orders
In June 2011, Go First placed an order for 72 Airbus A320neo aircraft worth . Deliveries began from 2016, with an induction rate of 12–15 aircraft per year. In December 2015, Airbus intimated that the deliveries will be delayed by three months due to technical issues and the aircraft will be delivered by the second quarter of financial year 2015–16. Go First received its first A320neo aircraft on 1 June 2016.

This deal was announced at Farnborough Airshow.

Services
Being a budget airline, Go First does not provide complimentary meals on its flights but offers options for buy on board in-flight meals. The airline publishes an in-flight magazine named Go-getter. Go First offers a premium service known as Go Business at a higher fare which provides extra services including seats with greater legroom, free meals, increased baggage allowance and priority boarding. In 2011, the airline launched its frequent flyer programme called Go Club, which provided benefits such as lounge access and free upgrade to Go Business. New membership was discontinued in February 2014.

Awards
Go First was rated as the "Best Domestic Airline For Excellence in Quality and Efficient Service" by Pacific Area Travel Writers Association in 2008. The airline was named the "Best Performing Airline" in Asia and Africa of all Airbus A320 operators by Airbus in 2011 based on fleet utilization and other performance metrics.

See also
 List of airlines of India
 Transport in India

References

External links

 

Airlines established in 2005
Airlines of India
Companies based in Mumbai
Indian companies established in 2005
Low-cost carriers
Wadia Group
2005 establishments in Maharashtra